Cap Éternité is a mountain in the municipality of Rivière-Éternité, the Le Fjord-du-Saguenay Regional County Municipality, in the administrative region of Saguenay-Lac-Saint-Jean, in Quebec, Canada. It overlooks, to the southwest, Éternité Bay while to the west is Cap Trinité.

The name of the cape was made official on December 5, 1968. To the west of the bay, the Éternité River gave its name to the municipality of Rivière-Éternité.

Its impressive rock mass and steep cliffs make it a major tourist attraction site in the Saguenay Fjord National Park. Cape Eternity inspired painters, poets and writers, including Charles Gill (1871–1918) and William Chapman (1850–1917).

Notes and references 

 

Landforms of Saguenay–Lac-Saint-Jean
Le Fjord-du-Saguenay Regional County Municipality